Edward Martin (March 7, 1936 – March 1, 2009) was mayor of Warner Robins, Georgia from 1988 to 1994.

In 1995, then Mayor Edward Martin was charged with blackmail after another member of the city's council received a threat regarding a compromising videotape.

References

Mayors of Warner Robins, Georgia
Politicians convicted of extortion under color of official right
1936 births
2009 deaths
Georgia (U.S. state) politicians convicted of crimes
20th-century American politicians
People from Georgetown, Illinois